Norbert Heffler (born 24 May 1990) is a Hungarian football player who plays for Gyirmót FC Győr. His brother, Tibor Heffler plays for Paksi SE.

References
HLSZ
Lombard FC Papa Official Website

1990 births
Living people
Sportspeople from Dunaújváros
Hungarian footballers
Association football midfielders
Dunaújváros FC players
Lombard-Pápa TFC footballers
Paksi FC players
BFC Siófok players
Soproni VSE players
Pécsi MFC players
Mezőkövesdi SE footballers
Nyíregyháza Spartacus FC players
Balmazújvárosi FC players
Kisvárda FC players
Gyirmót FC Győr players
Tiszakécske FC footballers
Nemzeti Bajnokság I players
Nemzeti Bajnokság II players
21st-century Hungarian people